Lara Arruabarrena Vecino and Ekaterina Ivanova were the defending champions, but both decided not to participate.
Eva Hrdinová and Mervana Jugić-Salkić won the title, defeating Sandra Klemenschits and Tatjana Malek in the final with the score 1–6, 6–3, [10–8].

Seeds

Draw

Draw

References
 Main Draw

Torneo Internazionale Regione Piemonte - Doubles
Torneo Internazionale Regione Piemonte